Ajani James Cornelius (born May 21, 2002) is an American football offensive lineman for the Oregon Ducks. He previously played with the Rhode Island Rams where he earned First-Team All-CAA honors before entering the transfer portal in 2022.

High school career
Cornelius attended Archbishop Stepinac High School in White Plains, New York. During his time there he was a back-to-back state and league champion in both 2018 and 2019, he also was named team captain and the 2019 Catholic High School Football League (CHSFLAAA) Offensive Lineman of the Year. Cornelius committed to the University of Rhode Island on February 3, 2020.

College career

Rhode Island
Cornelius made his collegiate debut at right tackle against No. 11 Delaware Fightin' Blue Hens in reserve during the 2020–21 spring season.

In first fall season as a freshman, he started all eleven games for the Rams. His first start came against the Bryant Bulldogs where the team rushed for a season-high 235 yards without allowing a single sack in a 45–21 win. He helped lead the Rams to average 133.6 rushing yards per game.

In 2022, Cornelius once again started all eleven games for the Rams. He helped the team have eight games where the team tallied over 150 yards, including 288 yards and three touchdown against the team's rival Brown. The team ranked fifth in the Colonial Athletic Association (CAA) sacks allowed with 21. The team also finished fourth in the CAA in both rushing yards per game with 168.8, and in passing yards per game with 235.5, alongside also being the third-highest scoring offense averaging 30.6 points per game. After the season, Cornelius received First Team All-CAA football honors. He entered the transfer portal on December 1, 2022.

Oregon 
On December 21, 2022, Cornelius transferred to the University of Oregon to play for the Ducks under coach Dan Lanning.

References

External links
Rhode Island Rams bio

2002 births
Living people
Players of American football from New York (state)
People from Manhattan
American football offensive linemen
Rhode Island Rams football players
Oregon Ducks football players